Robert Herman Nichols (born April 14, 1936) is an American professional golfer, best known for winning the PGA Championship in 1964.

Early years
Born in April 1936 and raised in Louisville, Kentucky, Nichols attended St. Xavier High School. While in high school, Nichols and several other youths were involved in an automobile accident resulting from a  joy ride. He suffered serious injuries including a broken pelvis, concussion, back and internal injuries, and was hospitalized 96 days. His legs were also paralyzed for about two weeks, but he was able to regain full use of his legs after intensive physical therapy. Nichols later played on the Aggies golf team at the Agricultural & Mechanical College of Texas (later renamed Texas A&M University) in the Southwest Conference.

Pro career
Nichols began playing on the PGA Tour in 1960 and recorded 12 victories, one of which, the PGA National Team Championship, was not fully recognized until 2012. He was a member of the Ryder Cup team in 1967, and his best year on tour was 1974 when he won twice, earned $124,747 and finished 14th on the money list. Nichols, Jerry Heard, and Lee Trevino were struck by lightning at the Western Open on Friday, June 27, 1975. All three men came back to play professional golf. Nichols has had 12 holes-in-one in his professional career.

The 1964 PGA Championship was played at the Columbus Country Club in Columbus, Ohio. Nichols won with a 271 total, three shots ahead of runners-up Arnold Palmer and defending champion Jack Nicklaus, playing in his hometown. This was a record low score for the PGA Championship and it stood for 30 years, until broken by Nick Price's 269 in 1994. Nichols was the first wire-to-wire winner since the PGA Championship switched format from match play to stroke play in 1958. He came close to winning a second major at the Masters in 1967, finishing second to his lifelong friend, Gay Brewer.

After turning 50 in 1986, Nichols played on the Senior PGA Tour, now the Champions Tour. He had numerous top-10 finishes but only one victory – the Southwestern Bell Classic in 1989, when he defeated Orville Moody on the third hole of a playoff.

Bobby Nichols Golf Course is a 9-hole municipal course that is part of Waverly Park in Louisville, southwest of downtown.

Professional wins (15)

PGA Tour wins (12)

PGA Tour playoff record (2–3)

Senior PGA Tour wins (1)

Senior PGA Tour playoff record (1–1)

Other senior wins (2)
1986 Showdown Classic (with Curt Byrum)
2007 Liberty Mutual Legends of Golf - Demaret Division (with Butch Baird)

Major championships

Wins (1)

Results timeline

Note: Nichols never played in The Open Championship.

CUT = missed the halfway cut
"T" indicates a tie for a place.

Summary

Most consecutive cuts made – 23 (1967 Masters – 1975 Masters)
Longest streak of top-10s – 2 (1962 U.S. Open – 1962 PGA)

U.S. national team appearances
Professional
Ryder Cup: 1967 (winners)

See also
List of golfers with most PGA Tour wins
List of men's major championships winning golfers

References

External links

Bobby Nichols Golf Course

American male golfers
Texas A&M Aggies men's golfers
PGA Tour golfers
PGA Tour Champions golfers
Winners of men's major golf championships
Ryder Cup competitors for the United States
Golfers from Kentucky
St. Xavier High School (Louisville) alumni
Sportspeople from Louisville, Kentucky
1936 births
Living people